Spaces is a Russian social network service that targets mobile phone users.

History
The website was launched in 2006.

In 2009, it was ranked 7th on Opera's top ten visited social networking sites.

Konstantin Vladimirovich Rak, who was sued by Epic Games for allegedly creating cheats to Fortnite, was a user of the service.

Currently, the site is going through not very good times of blocking in Russia, absence and frequent changes of site addresses, as well as frequent site hacks, data theft and constant DDOSS attacks, half of the users leave and transfer data to other services.
in 2022, the social network changed 7 domain names, due to frequent blocking in Russia, for pirated and prohibited content.

See also
 List of social networking services
 VK (service)
 Facebook

References

External links
 

2006 establishments in Russia
Internet properties established in 2006
Russian social networking websites

Social networking services
Social media companies
Social media
Mobile applications
Russian brands
Image-sharing websites
Video hosting